The Ulenge Island Rear Range Lighthouse is located in Tanga Region in northeastern Tanzania.

See also

 List of lighthouses in Tanzania

References

External links
 Tanzania Ports Authority 
 Picture of Ulenge Island Rear Range Lighthouse

Lighthouses in Tanzania
Buildings and structures in Tanga, Tanzania
Lighthouses completed in 1894